The 2013 Johnsonville Sausage 200 presented by Menards was the 14th stock car race of the 2013 NASCAR Nationwide Series and the fourth iteration of the event. The race was held on Saturday, June 22, 2013, in Elkhart Lake, Wisconsin at Road America, a  permanent road course. The race was extended from its scheduled 50 laps to 55 due to multiple green–white–checker finishes. At race's end, A. J. Allmendinger, driving for Penske Racing, would hold off the field on the final restart to complete a dominant performance and win his first career NASCAR Nationwide Series win and his first win of the season. To fill out the podium, Justin Allgaier of Turner Scott Motorsports and Parker Kligerman of Kyle Busch Motorsports would finish second and third, respectively.

Background 

Road America is a motorsport road course located near Elkhart Lake, Wisconsin on Wisconsin Highway 67. It has hosted races since the 1950s and currently hosts races in the NASCAR Xfinity Series, NTT Indycar Series, NTTWeatherTech SportsCar Championship, SCCA Pirelli World Challenge, ASRA, AMA Superbike series, IndyCar Series, and SCCA Pro Racing's Trans-Am Series.

Entry list 

*Withdrew.

Practice

First practice 
The first practice session was held on Friday, June 21, at 11:30 AM CST, and would last for an hour and 30 minutes.

Second and final practice 
The second and final practice session, sometimes referred to as Happy Hour, was held on Friday, June 21, at 1:30 PM CST, and would last for an hour and 25 minutes.

Qualifying 
Qualifying was held on Saturday, June 22, at 11:05 AM CST. Each driver would have one lap to set a time.

No drivers would fail to qualify.

Full qualifying results

Race results

References 

2013 NASCAR Nationwide Series
NASCAR races at Road America
June 2013 sports events in the United States
2013 in sports in Wisconsin